Karin Lian (born 12 March 1942 in Holmestrand) is a Norwegian politician for the Labour Party.

She was elected to the Norwegian Parliament from Vestfold in 1985, and was re-elected on two occasions. She also served in the position of deputy representative during the terms 1977–1981, 1981–1985 and  1997–2001. During the latter period she met as a regular representative meanwhile Jørgen Kosmo was appointed to the cabinet.

Lian was a member of Vestfold county council from 1979 to 1983.

References

1942 births
Living people
Labour Party (Norway) politicians
Members of the Storting
Women members of the Storting
21st-century Norwegian politicians
21st-century Norwegian women politicians
20th-century Norwegian politicians
20th-century Norwegian women politicians
People from Holmestrand